Laura Ikeji-Kanu (born March 15, 1988) is a Nigerian fashion blogger and entrepreneur. She is the founder of Hey! Laura, an online entertainment, fashion and lifestyle blog. She is starring on the Showmax reality television series The Real Housewives of Lagos.

Magazine covers and features
On 28 February 2018, she was covered by The Guardian Life Magazine a subsidiary of The Guardian newspaper. Where she discussed about her book "How To Make Money On Instagram". In June 2018 she was featured on Today's Woman Magazine well known as TW Magazine alongside the Nigerian actress Omoni Oboli.

In 2017 she was featured on Complete Sports on a list featuring entertainment celebrities related to former or active footballers.

2017–present

Endorsement deal
In May 2017, Nigerian hair brand BK Unique Hair Inc signed Ikeji as brand ambassador alongside Rita Dominic. In January 2018, the online store and sponsor of Big Brother Naija season 2 and 3 Payporte signed Ikeji as brand ambassador. In July 2018, Gtex homes signed Ikeji as brand ambassador alongside Mercy Aigbe Gentry.

Incomplete
On 4 July 2018, Ikeji launched her perfume fragrance Incomplete, which was sold out before the release date after she announced the pre-order sales.

Personal life
Ikeji is married to Christopher Kanu. The couple had their court wedding on 19 January 2017, in Lagos State, Nigeria. Their traditional marriage was held in her hometown in Nkwerre LGA, Imo state on 28 January 2017. In July 2017, the couple welcomed their first child together, Ryan Kanu, in Texas, United States of America.

On 15 March 2018, she celebrated her birthday with a brand new Mercedes-Benz.

Honours
The ECOWAS Female Parliamentarians Association (ECOFEPA) on Monday, May 21, 2018 in Abuja, honour Nigeria's vice president, Professor Yemi Osinbajo, business magnate, Alhaji Aliko Dangote alongside Davido, Don Jazzy, Ikeji and others.

Filmography

Film and television

References

External links
 

People from Imo State
1981 births
Nigerian women bloggers
21st-century Nigerian women writers
Living people
21st-century Nigerian businesswomen
21st-century Nigerian businesspeople
Nigerian editors
Nigerian bloggers
University of Lagos alumni
Nigerian media personalities
Nigerian television actresses
Participants in Nigerian reality television series